Apple Venus Volume 1 is the thirteenth studio album by the English rock band XTC, released in February 1999. It was the first on the band's own Idea Records label through Cooking Vinyl and distributed in the United States by TVT Records. The album relies heavily on strings, acoustic guitars and keyboards, expanding upon the more orchestral approach developed on the group's previous LP Nonsuch (1992), whilst its lyrics tackle paganist themes, middle age, blossoming romance, and rebirth. Apple Venus Volume 1 was met with critical acclaim and moderate sales, peaking at number 42 on the UK Albums Chart and number 106 on the US Billboard 200.

Bandleader Andy Partridge, who wrote most of Apple Venus, characterised the work as "orchustic", a portmanteau of "orchestral" and "acoustic". He meant the album title to refer to "a beautiful woman". The album effectively marked a comeback for XTC, who spent half the decade on strike against their former label Virgin Records. Apple Venus was originally planned as a double album, but because the group did not have enough money to record all the material they had stockpiled, they elected to split the more rock-oriented songs as "volume two" (released one year later as Wasp Star).

The making of Volume 1 was fraught with personal conflicts, budgetary concerns and numerous false starts. Most of the orchestral portions were rush-recorded in one day with a 40-piece symphony at Abbey Road Studios, and had to be edited over a months-spanning period. It was the last album to include guitarist Dave Gregory, who departed XTC while in the middle of the sessions due to frustrations with Partridge. By the time of its release, Partridge no longer viewed XTC as a band, and preferred it to be known as a "brand" covering his and bassist Colin Moulding's music.

In late 1999, XTC released Homespun, a version of Apple Venus consisting of its demos. This was followed in 2002 with Instruvenus, containing the album's backing tracks. In 2003, Mojo ranked Apple Venus at number 47 in its list of the "Top 50 Eccentric Albums". The album was included in the book 1001 Albums You Must Hear Before You Die.

Background

XTC's previous album, Nonsuch, was received with critical acclaim when released in April 1992. The song "Wrapped in Grey" was intended as the third single from the album, but was immediately withdrawn by their label Virgin Records. This left bandleader Andy Partridge particularly dismayed with the label. In 1993, he conceived the band's next project to be an album of bubblegum pop songs; the LP would have disguised itself as a retrospective compilation featuring 12 different groups from the early 1970s. The lyrics were heavily sexual, with song titles such as "Lolly (Suck It and See)" and "Visit to the Doctor". Partridge recalled playing some demos for Virgin agents, and compared their reaction to the "Springtime for Hitler" scene from the 1967 film The Producers. Virgin rejected his idea.

The label denied Partridge's requests to renegotiate or revoke XTC's contract. A&R representative Paul Kinder said: "What XTC wanted and what Virgin were prepared to do were poles apart. The contract was so old it got to the point where Andy wanted the moon and Virgin weren't prepared to give it him." Whatever new music the band recorded would have been automatically owned by Virgin, and so the group went on strike against the label. Other complications arose for Partridge, as he developed some health issues while his wife divorced him.

In 1997 (also reported as in late 1994), the band found themselves freed from financial debt and from Virgin after "making some heavy concessions". Partridge fantasied that the label had taken pity on the band for giving them a "rotten deal". While doing the press run for Apple Venus, he expressed distaste with the word "comeback", telling an interviewer: "We never went away! We just weren't legally allowed to work. Comebacks always have such glittery-suit, Fablon, working-men's clubs connotations."

Composition and lyrics

By 1997, Partridge and bassist Colin Moulding had amassed over 40 new songs, most of which were written by the former. The 11 that were ultimately selected for Apple Venus Volume 1 were written between 1992 and 1994. Partridge's offerings were an elaboration on the more orchestral style he previously developed with Nonsuch tracks "Omnibus", "Wrapped in Grey" and "Rook". When Nonsuch was completed, Partridge purchased an E-mu Proteus, and felt inspired by its samples, even though he was not a proficient keyboard player. His writing process changed in that, for some cases, the arrangement was completed before the actual composition. The songs changed little from how they were conceived on their early demo tapes when recorded in a professional studio.

Most of the lyrical content of Apple Venus is centred on themes of paganism, including the songs "River of Orchids", "Easter Theatre", "Greenman" and "Harvest Festival". Partridge thought the new material was "some of the best stuff, if not the best stuff" that he had ever written, calling it "more intensely passionate than before." In particular, he viewed "Easter Theatre" as one of the few "perfect songs" of his career, feeling that he had "exorcized a lot of those kind of Lennon-and-McCartney, Bacharach-and-David, Brian Wilson type ghosts out of my system by doing all that." "Greenman" was inspired by Green Men sculptures and pagan-derived nursery rhymes he saw Martin Carthy perform on a children's television program. He denied that the song was supposed to be Middle Eastern-sounding. "Harvest Festival" is Partridge's reflection on the harvest festivals from his youth. In an interview with New Sounds, Partridge confirmed that it was him, not Gregory, who played the guitar solo on "Easter Theatre": "I was determined not to tremolo like he would have done."

Even though the record's instrumental palette relies largely on orchestral strings, acoustic guitars and keyboards, there are a few exceptions where electric instrumentation can be heard. Additional textures are provided by brass, violins, woodwinds and only a few instances of percussion. Moulding felt that "something a bit different" was appropriate for the band at this juncture, and shared Partridge's desire for a cohesive LP similar to soundtracks such as My Fair Lady and "stuff that Burt Bacharach wrote for various [films]". The only songs of Moulding's that were included were "Fruit Nut" and "Frivolous Tonight", which ended up as the album's most uptempo tracks. According to Moulding, "Frivolous Tonight" was inspired by Beach Boys chords and a melody similar to "the theme song from Steptoe and Son, a comedy program in England. I smashed them together, and it worked out very well."

Of the album's remaining tracks, "Your Dictionary" was Partridge's reaction to the dissolution of his marriage. He initially did not want to include it on the album, but was persuaded by acquaintances who enjoyed the song. The same was true of "I Can't Own Her", which Partridge thought was "a little square, and a little wet". He credited "the core of the song" to the album's orchestral arranger Mike Batt. "I'd Like That" was inspired by a rekindled relationship with Erica Wexler, an American woman he met in the 1980s and would later marry. The music for the closing track "The Last Balloon" stemmed from an aborted collaboration between Partridge and an Italian musician, whereas the title came from The Last Balloon Home, one of the working titles for Nonsuch. It features a flugelhorn solo and lyrics about "that hope for the future, for your children -- for them not to make the same fucking mistakes as you!"

Production
The group elected to divide the project into two parts: one of rock songs, and the other of "orchustic" (orchestral/acoustic) songs augmented by a 40-piece symphony. "It's still a pop album," Moulding said. "It's not like 'XTC Meets the London Philharmonic." They found a label, Cooking Vinyl, and a producer, Haydn Bendall, who previously engineered the band's debut EP 3D EP (1977) and had significant experience in recording orchestras. Prairie Prince, who drummed on Skylarking (1986), returned for the sessions. It soon became apparent that the band did not have the funds to record all the material they had.

Moulding, Bendall and guitarist Dave Gregory wanted to reduce the project to one disc, but Partridge insisted on spreading it over two LPs. It was decided that they release one album with the orchestral portions ("volume 1") and leave the rock songs for its follow-up ("volume 2"). Preliminary "programming sessions" were conducted at Bendall's home in late 1997. The group then commenced recording at Chris Difford's home studio in Sussex, but the sessions fell apart after two weeks. Moulding said that the group had to leave because the studio was not yet fully functioning. According to Partridge in a 2007 interview, Difford "stole" the master tapes, "and he's still got them to this day," forcing the band to record the album from scratch—twice (the second runthrough was deemed unsatisfactory).

In early 1998, the group reconvened at Chipping Norton Recording Studios and recorded backing tracks over the course of six weeks. A single orchestral session was held at Abbey Road Studios, but its recording was rushed and had to be edited over a three-month period. According to Gregory, the band had no money left at this point, and the session had to be funded by a Japanese record label. John Morrish of The Independent reported that "the human string players could not match the mathematical precision of 'River of Orchids' ... Nor could the woodwinds cope with the computerised ostinato in 'Greenman' ... The orchestra became a glorified sample, cut and pasted together to achieve the 'Vaughan Williams with a hard-on' sound required." Much of this work was done with ProTools and with the assistance of Bendall, Partridge said, "until he had to quit to work on other projects." The rest of the album, which mostly involved vocal, bass and acoustic guitar overdubs, was recorded in Moulding's garage.

Gregory's departure

In March 1998, a few weeks into the Chipping Norton sessions, Gregory abruptly quit the band. Partridge told journalists that Gregory left because he grew impatient with the recording of the orchestral material and wanted to quickly move on to second project, which would have consisted of rock songs. He attributed Gregory's frustration to diabetic mood swings ("one minute he'd be quite jolly, the next minute he's 'this is all shit, destroy it, wipe it, it's all terrible'"). Moulding was not present for what he called an "enormous row" between Gregory and Partridge at the studio, but he corroborated that Gregory's diabetes caused "terrible mood swings, and his negativity was sometimes hard to take. But also, there really wasn't much for him to do on this record and he felt left out." Discussing the incident at Chipping Norton, Gregory said Partridge had behaved like "a cunt, frankly." Partridge said "I really blew up. I had a go at everyone but a lot of it was directed at Dave, telling him to pull his weight and get into it more. I don't think he ever forgave me."

Gregory denied that his leaving pertained to "musical differences", and said that it was more "personal problems" related to Partridge spending the entire recording budget on the expensive Abbey Road session. Another source of frustration was his keyboard playing; he did not feel that he had the skill that was demanded from Partridge and Bendall, "and the end result wasn't justifying the means." When Partridge requested Gregory to write musical charts for the 40-piece orchestra, Gregory turned in a cheaper arrangement for four players, which was rejected. Gregory quoted Partridge saying "Compromise equals crap art". Once another arranger was hired, he began distancing himself from the band. Partridge remembered: "You'd be doing an interview and you'd say the band's doing so-and-so, and he'd interrupt and say, 'Band? It's not a bloody band, it's two people making solo albums and a guitarist ... Anyway, carry on.'" Gregory also refused to sign an American distribution contract with TVT Records. He had telephoned artists who worked for the label and got "the worst possible reaction ... 'You will not be paid,' those were the four words I remember."

Gregory said he told Partridge that Apple Venus was not "the album we should be making after six years," calling it "the vegetarian alternative." By the time the album was released, he maintained that "Andy's done a good job in recording the songs." Partridge also no longer viewed XTC as a band, instead preferring it to be known as a "brand" covering his and Moulding's music.

Title and packaging

The album's title was meant to refer to "a beautiful woman". The phrase originated as a lyric on the previous XTC record, Nonsuch, specifically in Partridge's song "Then She Appeared" ("then she appeared / apple venus on a half-open shell"). This continued a trend that began with Oranges & Lemons (1989) and Nonsuch (both album titles had appeared as lyrics on a track from their respective prior albums). According to Partridge, he did not realise that such a pattern had emerged, and that it was "pure coincidence, probably a sub-conscious kind of thing. You have a certain caterpillar track of words that kind of trundle around in your head." However, it was deliberate in the case of Apple Venus.

Partridge's working title for the album, A History of the Middle Ages, was vetoed by his bandmates. He settled on Apple Venus after finding an illustration of a peacock feather that resembled an uvula, which evoked to him something "very vulvic and female". Written underneath the track listing on the back of the album cover is the Wiccan Rede "do what you will but harm none." Partridge thought it was a "fantastic" message, and when responding to a question about Wiccan topics, he explained: "I have a smattering of knowledge of that sort of thing, but I['m] also ... interested in the pre-Christian appreciation of the land and the spirit of things, spirits in animate things and inanimate things."

in Japan, the liner notes included comments from musicians such as singer-songwriter Tamio Okuda and Aiha Higurashi of Seagull Screaming Kiss Her Kiss Her (named after the XTC song).

Release

Released on 17 February 1999, Apple Venus Volume 1 was met with critical acclaim and moderate sales. It had minimal promotion. PopMatters Sarah Zupko deemed the album "more than worth the wait. Andy Partridge and Colin Moulding used their time off well, lavishing extra care and attention on this set of tunes that rank among the best music they have ever produced. ... this record is a shoo-in for one of 1999’s best records". Scott Schinder gave the album an A− for Entertainment Weekly, writing: "The gorgeous yet vaguely unsettling arrangements are well suited to the exquisitely flawed humanism of Andy Partridge’s and Colin Moulding’s compositions, lending an appropriately uneasy edge to bittersweet tunes like 'I Can’t Own Her,' 'Greenman,' and 'The Last Balloon.'"

In comparing the album to the group's earlier work, Pitchforks Zach Hooker said: "Apple Venus finds them picking up pretty much where they left off. Or maybe even a little bit before they left off." Stylistically, he regarded the album as the middle point between Oranges and Lemons and Skylarking, calling Apple Venus "a little nestegg of excellent songs". Rolling Stones Barry Walters wrote that the LP "packs the wit and nerve that made their rock snap but does it with brass, acoustic guitars, violins, woodwinds and minimal percussion. ...  instead of evoking the Sixties, Partridge and Moulding suggest a timeless pastoral past rich with melody and subtlety." AllMusic's Stephen Thomas Erlewine noted: "Although there are similarities with the pastoral Skylarking or parts of Nonsuch, there is really no comparable record in XTC's canon, given its sustained mood, experimentalism, and glimpses of confession ... [Apple Venus] easily ranks as one of XTC's greatest works".

Conversely, Robert Christgau wrote that "Studio rats being studio rats, the lyrics aren't as deep as Andy and Colin think they are, but at least irrelevant doesn't equal obscure, humorless, or lachrymose." The Chicago Tribunes Greg Kot warned that the album could be "perhaps too radical [of a] departure" for veteran fans. The Daily Telegraphs Alexis Petridis commented that while it is a "minor quibble", the album's "worst excess" may be its "whimsy". NMEs Jim Wirth wrote that even though Partridge and Moulding have a "nasty habit of hammering really hard on the twee pedal in moments of boredom, there's still enough of that psychedelic bumpkin magic to make this worth celebrating."

In late 1999, XTC released Homespun, a version of Apple Venus consisting of its demos. This was followed in 2002 with Instruvenus, containing the album's backing tracks. Wasp Star (Apple Venus Volume 2) was released on 23 May 2000.

Track listing

Personnel
Per liner notes.

XTC
Colin Moulding – vocals, bass guitar
Andy Partridge – vocals, guitars, keyboard programming

Additional musicians

Mike Batt – orchestral arrangements on "Greenman" and "I Can't Own Her"
Haydn Bendall – keyboards
Guy Barker – trumpet and flugelhorn solo on "The Last Balloon"
Nick Davis – keyboards
Dave Gregory – piano, keyboards, keyboard programming, guitars, backing vocals
Prairie Prince – drums, percussion
Steve Sidwell – trumpet solo on "Easter Theatre"
All arrangements played by the London Sessions Orchestra under their leader Gavin [sic] Wright

Production

Haydn Bendall – original production, engineering
Nick Davis – additional production, engineering, mixing
Simon Dawson – mix assistance
Alan Douglas – recording engineering
Barry Hammond – recording engineer
Tim Young – mastering

Charts

References

External links
 

1999 albums
XTC albums
Albums produced by Nick Davis (record producer)
Albums recorded in a home studio
Cooking Vinyl albums
Orchestral pop albums